Fernand Lamy (8 April 1881 – 18 September 1966) was a French composer, music teacher, conductor and choral conductor.

Life 
Born in Chauvigny, Lamy was a disciple and friend of Guy Ropartz. He has written reference works on this composer. He has notably collaborated in the review L'Harmonie du monde. He started his career working on military music. He was later choir conductor and then conductor of the Théâtre des Champs-Élysées. He conducted Russian ballets and worked with Gabriel Astruc. He then worked at the Valenciennes conservatory, of which he was the director, and founded in particular the Association des concerts symphoniques and the Société de musique de chambre. His students include Robert Lannoy, Jean Bertrand and Roberto Benzi. His son is the pianist and organist Jacques Lamy.

References

External links 

1881 births
1966 deaths
People from Vienne
20th-century French composers
French male conductors (music)
French choral conductors
French music educators
French male musicians
20th-century French conductors (music)
20th-century French male musicians